Arpavar may refer to:
 Arevshat, Armenia
 Lusakert, Ararat, Armenia